Fenxiang (分香), literally the incense division, is a term that defines both hierarchical networks of temples dedicated to a particular Deity or Deities in Chinese folk religion, and the ritual process by which these networks form.

Networks
Networks of affiliated temples dedicated to the cult of a specific God or Deity can proliferate extensively. These networks are economic and social bodies, and in certain moments of history have even taken military functions. They also represent routes of pilgrimage, with communities of devotees from the affiliated temples going up in the hierarchy to the senior temple. One notable example will Baishatun Mazu Pilgrimage in Taiwan.

Ritual of creation of a new temple
When a new temple dedicated to the same Deity is founded, it enters the sacred network through the ritual of division of incense. This consists in filling the incense burner of the new temple with ashes brought from the incense burner of an existing temple. The new temple is therefore spiritually affiliated to the older existing temple, and back in the hierarchy to the very first temple dedicated to the Deity.

See also
 Jingxiang, incense worship
 Miaohui, temple gathering

Footnotes

References

Sources
 

Chinese folk religion
Taoist priesthood
Taoist temples